Daniel Francis Haggerty (November 19, 1942 – January 15, 2016) was an American actor who was best known for playing the title role in the film and television series The Life and Times of Grizzly Adams.

Early life 
Haggerty's birthplace is given as Pound, Wisconsin, and his birth year has been reported as 1942. His parents separated when he was three.

Acting career 
Haggerty was cast in a small non-speaking role as a bodybuilder in the 1964 film Muscle Beach Party and also as a bodybuilder in Girl Happy. He also worked as a stuntman on the 1966 television series Tarzan, and as set builder on various other projects. More stunt work followed, as well as supporting roles in numerous low-budget biker and wildlife films of the era, such as Easy Rider, Angels Die Hard, The Adventures of Frontier Fremont, and Terror Out of the Sky. In addition to his bit part as a hippie in Easy Rider, he also assisted in building the motorcycles featured in the film.

 His experience with animals also brought him work as an animal trainer and handler in films produced by Walt Disney Studios. Haggerty directed white tigers, wolverines, eagles, and wild boar in the 1974 feature film When the North Wind Blows for Sunn Classic Pictures, which also produced The Life and Times of Grizzly Adams, a wildly popular film released the same year, in which he portrayed the title character Grizzly Adams. From the latter film evolved the NBC television series of the same name which ran from 1977 to 1978, and Haggerty became known to movie-goers for his portrayal of nature-loving James Capen "Grizzly" Adams.

Haggerty starred in the television film Condominium (1980), which also starred Barbara Eden, Ralph Bellamy and Stuart Whitman. Haggerty played a hydrology expert trying to warn residents that their Florida condos were about to be demolished in an approaching hurricane. In 1981, he appeared in an episode of Charlie's Angels, called "Waikiki Angels," as Bo Thompson. He guest-starred on The Love Boat in 1983 ("World's Greatest Kisser"). That year, he also appeared briefly in David Carradine's 1983 film Americana and provided a fighting dog for the production. In the film, he not only played the role of the dog's trainer, but also assisted in set design and the restoration of a broken down carousel, which figured prominently in the film. 

Haggerty made a cameo appearance as an attorney in Terror Night (1987) with John Ireland and Cameron Mitchell, starred in Night Wars (1988) as a Vietnam veteran who is a psychologist dealing with nightmares of his fellow veterans, and appeared in horror films such as Elves and the Linda Blair film The Chilling in 1989. He starred in the 1989 film Spirit of the Eagle.

Haggerty played lead roles in the films Repo Jake (1990) and Elves (1990).  In 1995's Grizzly Mountain, he starred as a modern-day version of Grizzly Adams and worked with bears, foxes, and hawks in the film. He reprised his role in Escape to Grizzly Mountain (2000). Haggerty was featured as a character in Al Franken's 1999 political satire novel, Why Not Me?.

Haggerty continued to work as both an actor and infomercial spokesman. One of his endorsements was for the Pap-Ion Magnetic Inductor (PAP-IMI), a device alleged to have health benefits. He had only been hired as a spokesperson and was found not to be part of the fraud that later embroiled the manufacturer.

In Big Stan (2007), he played Tubby, and appeared as a lumberjack foreman in Axe Giant: The Wrath of Paul Bunyan (2013). Haggerty also did several voice-overs and can also be seen in music videos by Hank Williams Jr. and Rogues of the Empire.
Haggerty appeared on the U.S. television show American Pickers in its episode "California Kustom", which aired February 25, 2013.

Personal life
Haggerty was married twice. He married Diane Rooker in 1959 at a Las Vegas wedding chapel in the Silver Slipper Hotel when they were 17. Haggerty and Diane had two daughters, Tracey and Tammy. They divorced in 1984, after which Haggerty married Samantha Hilton. Haggerty and Samantha had two sons named Dylan and Cody and one daughter named Megan. They were married until Samantha's death following a motorcycle accident on August 10, 2008.

Haggerty lived on a small ranch in Malibu Canyon with an assortment of wild animals that he had tamed at birth or rescued from injury. In 1977, his beard caught fire from shooting back a flaming cocktail. Trying to put the flames out, Haggerty received third-degree burns on his arms. Production on The Life and Times of Grizzly Adams television series was halted while Haggerty recovered. In 1991, Haggerty was again hospitalized after a motorcycle accident left him in a coma, recovering with no aftereffects.

In 1985, Haggerty was convicted of selling cocaine to an undercover police officer, receiving a jail sentence of 90 days and three years' probation.

Death
Haggerty was diagnosed with spinal cancer after undergoing back surgery, when a tumor on his spine was discovered in August 2015. He died of spinal cancer on January 15, 2016, in Burbank, California.

Selected filmography

Muscle Beach Party (1964)
Girl Happy (1964)
Easy Rider (1969)
Angels Die Hard (1970)
The Tender Warrior (1971)
Chrome and Hot Leather (1971)
Bury Me an Angel (1972)
Pink Angels (1972)
Hex (1973)
Superchick (1973)
When the North Wind Blows (1974)
The Life and Times of Grizzly Adams (1974)
The Adventures of Frontier Fremont (1976)
Grizzly Adams: Once Upon a Starry Night (1978)
King of the Mountain (1981)
The Capture of Grizzly Adams (1982) 
Americana (1983)
Abducted (1986)
Terror Night (1987)
Bloody Movie (1987)
Nightwars (1988) 
Elves (1989)
The Chilling (1989)
Spirit of the Eagle (1989)
Ice Pawn (1989)
Mind Trap (1989)
Repo Jake (1990)
Chance (1990)
Inheritor (1990)
One Man War~ Macon County War (original title) (1990) 
Soldier's Fortune (1992)
The Magic Voyage (1994)
Cheyenne Warrior (1994)
The Christmas Light (1995)
Sign of the Otter (1995)
The Little Patriot (1995)
Abducted 2: The Reunion (1995)
The Christmas Brigade (1996)
Grizzly Mountain (1997)
Born Champion (1998)
Puss in Boots (1999)
Escape to Grizzly Mountain (2000)
An Ordinary Killer (2003)
Motocross Kids (2004)
Big Stan (2007)
The Book of Ruth: Journey of Faith (2009)
Casa de mi Padre (2012)
Axe Giant: The Wrath of Paul Bunyan (2013)
Dead In 5 Heartbeats (2013)
40 Nights (2016)

Awards
 Received a star on the Hollywood Walk of Fame in 1994.
 Awarded The Dove Foundation's "Diamond Seal of Approval" for over 1 million family videos sold.
 Awarded the Harley-Davidson "Humanitarian of the Year" Award in 1986.
 Awarded the People's Choice Award for most popular actor in 1980.
 Awarded the Paul Harris Fellowship from the Rotary Foundation of Rotary International
 Awarded a "Star" in Kanab, Utah — "Hollywood of the West" in 2009

References

External links

1942 births
2016 deaths
American male television actors
American male film actors
Animal trainers
Deaths from cancer in California
Neurological disease deaths in California
Deaths from spinal cancer
Male actors from California
Male actors from Los Angeles County, California
Male actors from Wisconsin
American stunt performers
Entertainers from California
People from Marinette County, Wisconsin